The Melodi Grand Prix Junior 2007 was Norway's sixth national Melodi Grand Prix Junior for young singers aged 8 to 15. It was held on June 2, 2007, in Oslo Spektrum, Oslo, Norway and broadcast live presented by Stian Barsnes Simonsen. Nine participants participated and the contest was won by 11-year-old Celine Helgemo with her song Bæstevænna (Bestfriends). She received the award out of the hands of Ole Runar, who won the 2006 contest with his song "Fotball e supert".

The first and second-place winners, Celine and the duo Martin & Johannes, were Norway's participants in MGP Nordic 2007 with additional contestants from Denmark, Sweden, and Finland.

The album Melodi Grand Prix Junior 2007 containing the songs of the finals reached No. 1 on the VG-lista Norwegian Albums Chart on week 24 of 2007 staying at the top of the charts for 1 week.

Results

First round

Super Final
Here's the results from the superfinal. Highlighted contestants went to MGP Nordic 2007.

Interval Acts
During the interval, Venke Knutson performed her song "Holiday".

Melodi Grand Prix Junior
Music festivals in Norway